The Portland Oregon Temple is a temple of the Church of Jesus Christ of Latter-day Saints (LDS Church) located on  of land near the intersection of Highway 217 and I-5 in Lake Oswego, Oregon. The temple's architecture features six white spires and a white marble exterior accented with green marble trim and topped with a green slate roof.

History
The temple in Portland was the church's first in Oregon, dedicated in 1989, by Gordon B. Hinckley; with the Medford Oregon Temple completed in 2000.  In 1989, more than 314,000 people attended the public open house held before the temple was dedicated by Gordon B. Hinckley.

University of New Mexico historian, Ferenc Morton Szasz, places the temple in a group of Post-World War II temples built in western American States, calling the group of Mormon temples "the most impressive religious structures of the entire western postwar building boom."

The temple, the church's 42nd operating structure, serves members of stakes in the Portland metropolitan area, other parts of Oregon and two cities in Washington.

In 2012, the church added a visitor's center which is open to the public daily from 9:00 a.m. to 9:00 p.m., which, along with the temple's grounds, continues to be enjoyed by the surrounding community.  The visitor's center was formally dedicated by Gary E. Stevenson in June 2013.

In 2014, the temple celebrated the 25th year the temple has been in operation.

In 2020, the Portland Oregon Temple was closed in response to the coronavirus pandemic.

See also

 List of temples of The Church of Jesus Christ of Latter-day Saints by geographic region
 The Church of Jesus Christ of Latter-day Saints in Oregon

Gallery

References

External links
 
Portland Oregon Temple Official site
Portland Oregon Temple at ChurchofJesusChristTemples.org

20th-century Latter Day Saint temples
Buildings and structures in Clackamas County, Oregon
Buildings and structures in Lake Oswego, Oregon
Religious buildings and structures in Oregon
Religious buildings and structures completed in 1989
Temples (LDS Church) in the United States
Tourist attractions in Clackamas County, Oregon
1989 establishments in Oregon
The Church of Jesus Christ of Latter-day Saints in Oregon